Jane Webster (born 2 August 1956), now known as Jane Sutton, is a retired English badminton player noted for her strong and consistent shot-making. Though competitive at a world-class level in singles, her greatest success came in doubles competition.

Career
She won the 1980 IBF World Championships in women's doubles with Nora Perry. The same year they also won the 1980 European Badminton Championships, and in 1981 they captured the All England Doubles title. Webster and Perry were silver medalists in defense of their title at the then triennial World Championships in 1983. She won the English National ladies doubles title in 1978–79 with Gillian Gilks and the 1981–82 and 1982–83 titles with Nora Perry. Webster also won the English National Ladies Singles title in the 1981–82 season, her best in singles which included victories in the Dutch Open and the Indian Masters Invitation. Webster shared the Japan Open Ladies Doubles Title in 1982 with Nora Perry. Her last major title before retiring was the 1984 Indonesian Open ladies doubles crown, again, with Nora Perry. She represented England 85 times in international team matches.

Major achievements

References
 All England champions 1899–2007
 Statistics at badmintonengland.co.uk
 European competition results

External links
 
 

1956 births
Living people
English female badminton players
Commonwealth Games medallists in badminton
Commonwealth Games gold medallists for England
Badminton players at the 1978 Commonwealth Games
World Games medalists in badminton
World Games silver medalists
Competitors at the 1981 World Games
Medallists at the 1978 Commonwealth Games